= Cardiac notch =

Cardiac notch may refer to:

- Cardiac notch of the left lung
- Cardiac notch of stomach
